Charles-Olivier Michaud is a Canadian writer, director and producer from Saint-Romuald, Quebec. He has worked in English and French language films. His directing credits include 4 Minute Mile, On the Beat (Sur le rythme) and Snow and Ashes.

Filmography
2010 - Snow and Ashes - Writer, director, producer
2011 - On the Beat (Sur le rythme) - Director
2012 - Exile (Exil) - Director
2014 - 4 Minute Mile - Director
2015 - Anna - Writer, director

References

External links

Film directors from Quebec
Canadian screenwriters in French
Writers from Quebec City
Living people
1979 births